Definers Public Affairs was an American right leaning opposition research firm based in Arlington, Virginia. It performed media monitoring services, conducted research using the Freedom of Information Act and also created strategic communication to negatively influence the public image about individuals, firms, candidates and organizations who oppose their clients. Definers shared at least nine current and former executives, as well as its office space, with America Rising, a Republican-affiliated political action committee, and NTK Network, a digital news aggregator.

Organization and operations 
Definers was founded by Republican Party political operatives Joe Pounder and Matt Rhoades in 2016.

In 2017, Dentons formed a strategic partnership with Definers dubbed 3D Global Affairs. Among the services offered at 3D Global Affairs would be "governmental relations and lobbying support to shape the environment...campaign-style opposition research" and “communications and rapid response professionals to direct  the narrative.”

Definers established an office in San Francisco to provide opposition research to Silicon Valley clients. In 2017 Definers opened an office in London called the U.K. Policy Group, headed by Andrew Goodfellow, the former head of research for the Conservative Party.

Definers often supports its clients by pitching stories to news outlets such as NTK Network and America Rising, which were sometimes picked up by larger media organisations like Breitbart and GotNews, which was owned by the alt-right activist Charles C. Johnson. According to Definers' proposal to potential clients, the goal was to "create an echo chamber effect" among these various outlets. An anonymous former employee for Definers called NTK Network its "in-house fake news shop".

Contract with Environmental Protection Agency
In December 2017, Definers Public Affairs was paid $120,000 in a no-bid contract from the United States Environmental Protection Agency (EPA) for services which included searching for "resistance figures" opposing the agenda of Administrator Scott Pruitt, appointed to head the agency under President Donald Trump. During the bid Definers listed itself erroneously as a "small disadvantaged business", which was corrected after receiving the contract. Allan Blutstein a lawyer for Definers Public Affairs lodged FOI requests on low-level bureaucrats that were perceived to be hostile to Pruitt's agenda,  Definers work was incorrectly listed as in the contract to perform “media monitoring” services. Definers cancelled the contract after receiving media scrutiny.

William K. Reilly, the EPA administrator under President George H.W. Bush, criticized the hiring of Definers Public Affairs, saying that: "Mr. Pruitt appears not to understand that the two most valuable assets EPA has is the country’s trust and a very committed professional work force.  This shows complete insensitivity, complete tone-deafness, or something worse." John O’Grady, President of the American Federation of Government Employees Council 238, which represents approximately 10,000 EPA employees, was the target of a Definers FOIA request, and called the firm a threat to EPA employees. Charles Tiefer of the University of Baltimore argued that Definers is benefiting from politically-motivated crony capitalism.

Allegations by Shervin Pishevar
In November 2017 Venture capitalist Shervin Pishevar filed a lawsuit against Definers Public Affairs, alleging that it orchestrated a smear campaign against him.

Contract with Facebook 
In October 2017, Facebook expanded its work with Definers Public Affairs, that had originally been hired to monitor press coverage of the company to address concerns primarily regarding Russian meddling, then mishandling of user data by Cambridge Analytica, hate speech on Facebook, and calls for regulation. Definers had established a Silicon Valley outpost earlier that year led by Tim Miller, a former spokesman for Jeb Bush. For tech firms, he argued in one interview, a goal should be to "have positive content pushed out about your company and negative content that’s being pushed out about your competitor." Elliot Schrage, Facebook's Head of Communications and Policy stated in a blog post, that he asked Definers Public Affairs to open a file on Soros after the philanthropist called Facebook "a menace to society" in a speech earlier this year. A research document circulated by Definers to reporters this summer, just a month after the House hearing, linked George Soros, a frequent subject of antisemitic conspiracy theories, to critics of Facebook.

Following the public outcry from the New York Times article on the activity of Definers Public Affairs, Facebook cut ties with the agency. George Soros' Open Society Foundation put a statement out that said the content was a "deliberate strategy to distract" from Facebook's own scandals and that the "methods threaten the very values underpinning our democracy." Tim Miller defended the accuracy of Definers' work stating that "Definers shared a narrow document about an anti-Facebook group's funding. It was entirely factual." BuzzFeed News published some of Definers' research on Soros.

References

External links
 

Opposition research
Competitive intelligence
Privately held companies based in Virginia
Companies based in Arlington County, Virginia
2016 establishments in Virginia
American companies established in 2016